Riddles (Old Norse, Icelandic and Faroese gáta, pl. gátur; Bokmål and Nynorsk gåte, pl. gåter; Danish gåde, pl. gåder; Swedish gåta, pl. gåtor) are widely attested in post-medieval Scandinavian languages, though the traditional, oral riddle fell out of widespread use during the later twentieth century, being replaced by other oral-literary forms, and by other tests of wit such as quizzes.

Medieval period
Few riddles are attested from medieval Scandinavia (by contrast with the numerous Anglo-Saxon riddles in the quite closely connected literature of medieval England), although Norse mythology does attest to a number of other wisdom-contests, usually involving the god Óðinn, and the complex metaphors of the extensive corpus of skaldic verse present an enigmatic aesthetic similar to riddles. A number of riddles from medieval Scandinavia are also attested in Latin.

Almost all the surviving Old Norse riddles occur in one section of the Icelandic Hervarar saga ok Heiðreks, in which the god Óðinn propounds around 37 riddles (depending on the manuscript), though a riddle also appears in Þjalar-Jóns saga, and three medieval riddles about birds are known, first attested in a part of the manuscript Reykjavík, Stofnun Árna Magnússonar AM 625 4to from around 1500.

Unlike the Old English riddles, the riddles in Hervarar saga have a fairly tight stanzaic form, often with formulaic phrases like "hvat er þat undra, er ek úti sá | fyrir Dellings durum?" ("what wonder is that, which I saw outside, before the doors of Dellingr?"). The riddles in Heiðreks saga are well integrated into the genre of Eddaic poetry, and provide insights into Norse mythology, medieval Scandinavian social norms, and rarely attested poetic forms. They were also the subject of a seventeenth-century commentary by Björn Jónsson á Skarðsá.

The topics of the riddles in Heiðreks saga (in the order and with the solutions given in the R-manuscript, and with the numbering of the verses as given in Christopher Tolkien's 1960 edition) are: 44. ale, 45. bridge over a river under birds, 46. dew, 47. hammer, 48. bellows, 49. spiders, 50. leek, 51. obsidian, 52. nesting swans, 53. angelicas, 54. a dead snake on a dead horse on an ice floe floating down a river, 55. chessmen, 56. hnefatafl, 57. fire, 58. fog, 59. the húnn in hnefatafl, 60. shield, 61. ptarmigans, 62. daughters of Hlér (waves), 63. waves, 64. women of Ægir (waves), 65. duck nesting in the skull of an ox, 66. anchor, 67. waves, 68. piglets suckling a sow, 69. sow and unborn piglets, 70. cow, 71. falcon carrying an eider-duck to its mountain, viewed from a wall, 72. Óðinn riding Sleipnir, 73. 'What did Óðinn say in the ear of Baldr before he was carried onto the funeral-pyre?' The H-manuscript includes riddles on the following further themes: raven, dew, fish, waterfall; hail and rain; dung-beetle; arrow; sun; weaving; embers.

The riddle of the sow with an unborn litter has a precursor in the Anglo-Saxon poet Aldhelm's enigma 84, 'De scrofa pregnante'. But only two of the Heiðreks saga riddles seem to reflect the stock of folk-riddles known from more widely in Europe. One is an example of the famous cow-riddle:

The cow has four udders, four legs, two horns, two back legs, and one tail.

The other is the so-called "Óðinn riddle", which is a variant of the international Rider-and-horse riddle:

Becoming more widely known in the early modern period through printed editions of the saga, this riddle entered oral tradition. A modern Swedish children's variant of the same runs "vad har tre ögon, tio ben och en svans?" ("what has three eyes, ten legs and a tail?"). Indeed, the whole riddle-contest in Heiðreks saga seems to have become the basis for a Faroese ballad, Gátu ríma ('riddle ballad'), first attested from nineteenth-century oral tradition.

Modern period
With the advent of print in the West, collections of riddles and similar kinds of questions began to be published. A large number of riddle collections were printed in the German-speaking world and, partly under German influence, in Scandinavia. Scandinavian riddles have also been extensively collected from oral tradition. Key collections and studies include:

 Bødker, Laurits 1964 in co-operation with Brynjulf Alver, Bengt Holbek and Leea Virtanen. The Nordic Riddle. Terminology and Bibliography. Copenhagen.
 Jón Árnason, Íslenzkar gátur, skemtanir, vikivakar og Þulur, I (Kaupmannahöfn: Hið Íslenzka bókmenntafélag, 1887).
 Olsson, Helmer 1944. Svenska gåtor 1. Folkgåtor från Bohuslän. Uppsala.
 Palmenfelt, Ulf 1987. Vad är det som går och går...? Svenska gåtor från alla tider i urval av Ulf Palmenfelt. Stockholm.
 Peterson, Per 1985. Gåtor och skämt. En undersökning om vardagligt berättande bland skolbarn. Etnolore 4. Skrifter från Etnologiska institutionen vid Uppsala universitet. Uppsala: Uppsala universitet.
 Ström, Fredrik 1937. Svenska Folkgåtor. Stockholm.
 Wessman, V.E.V. (red.) 1949. Finlands svenska folktidning IV. Gåtor. Skrifter utg. av Svenska Litteratursällskapet i Finland 327. Helsingfors.

References

External links
 Humoristen.no - Norwegian riddles
 Gåter.no – collection of Norwegian riddles, categorised
 Collection of Swedish riddles

Riddles
Germanic culture